Puncak Mandala or Mandala Peak (until 1963 Julianatop or Juliana Peak) is a mountain located in Highland Papua, Indonesia. At , it is the highest point of the Jayawijaya (Orange) Range and included in Seven Second Summits. Following Mount Carstensz (4884 m) 350 km to the west, Mandala is the second highest freestanding mountain of Oceania, Australasia, New Guinea and Indonesia.

Geology 
Mandala is one of the three high massifs of Western New Guinea, together with the Carstensz and Trikora complexes. This peak used to have an ice cap, but it was last seen in 1989 and by 2003 it was totally gone. Based on the Shuttle Radar Topography Mission data, this peak is likely higher than Puncak Trikora, which lost its icecap in about 1960.

Ascents
Climbers from the Dutch 1959 expedition to the Star Mountains reached the peak of Puncak Mandala on 9 September.

See also
List of Southeast Asian mountains
List of Ultras of Malay Archipelago
List of highest mountains of New Guinea

References

Further reading
 "Puncak Mandala" at GunungBagging.com

Mountains of Western New Guinea
Seven Second Summits
Four-thousanders of New Guinea